The wreck of a wooden sailing vessel was discovered in Thorness Bay, Isle of Wight, England in 2010. The site was designated under the Protection of Wrecks Act on 31 July 2013. The wreck is a Protected Wreck managed by Historic England.

The wreck 
The site consists of dispersed ship structure made up of framing, planking, fixtures and fittings. Identifiable objects include rigging, navigation equipment, and possible cargo. It is believed to be a mid-to-late nineteenth century cargo vessel.

Discovery and investigation 
The wreck was discovered in 2010 during survey for the New Forest National Park Authority as part of a wider project. A comprehensive site survey was undertaken in 2011.

References

Shipwrecks in the English Channel
Protected Wrecks of England
Wreck diving sites in England